The 1978 Czechoslovak motorcycle Grand Prix was the twelfth round of the 1978 Grand Prix motorcycle racing season. It took place on 27 August 1978 at the Brno circuit.

350 cc classification

250 cc classification

50 cc classification

Sidecar classification

References

Czech Republic motorcycle Grand Prix
Czechoslovak
Motorcycle Grand Prix